Glyphipterix semiflavana is a species of sedge moth in the genus Glyphipterix. It was described by Syuti Issiki in 1930. It is found in China and Japan.

Adults are 4–5 mm long. There is one generation per year.

References

Moths described in 1930
Glyphipterigidae
Moths of Asia
Moths of Japan